Sperminator may refer to:
 Cecil Jacobson, an American former fertility doctor who used his own sperm to impregnate his patients without informing them. 
 Ari Nagel, an American maths professor and sperm donor.